Jeffery Lavell Posey (born August 14, 1975 in Bassfield, Mississippi) is a former American football linebacker in the National Football League.  He was signed by the San Francisco 49ers as an undrafted free agent in 1998.  He played college football at Southern Mississippi.

In addition to the 49ers, Posey played for the Carolina Panthers, Jacksonville Jaguars, Houston Texans, Buffalo Bills, and Washington Redskins in his career. He has 5 kids and a wife.

1975 births
Living people
American football linebackers
Pearl River Wildcats football players
Southern Miss Golden Eagles football players
San Francisco 49ers players
Carolina Panthers players
Jacksonville Jaguars players
Houston Texans players
Buffalo Bills players
Washington Redskins players